Blake Horton is an Australian footballer who plays as a goalkeeper for Coniston in the Illawarra Premier League.

Born in Nowra, New South Wales, Horton began his senior career for Rockdale City Suns before moving to the Netherlands to play for Telstar in 2015.

Career
Horton made his debut for Telstar in the Dutch Eerste Divisie on 30 January 2016, coming on as a second half substitute after an injury to Wesley Zonneveld against FC Emmen. He made his first competitive start for the side on 15 April 2016 in a draw with FC Oss.

Horton returned to Australia to play in the Illawarra Premier League in 2019.

References

External links
 

Living people
1994 births
Association football goalkeepers
Australian soccer players
Rockdale Ilinden FC players
SC Telstar players
Mildenhall Town F.C. players
National Premier Leagues players
Eerste Divisie players
People from Nowra
Australian expatriate soccer players
Expatriate footballers in the Netherlands
Australian expatriate sportspeople in the Netherlands
OFC Oostzaan players
Sportsmen from New South Wales
Soccer players from New South Wales